Sweet Lavender is a 1915 British silent romance film directed by Cecil M. Hepworth and starring Henry Ainley, Chrissie White and Alma Taylor. It is based on the 1888 play Sweet Lavender by Arthur Wing Pinero.

Cast
 Henry Ainley as Dick Phenyl  
 Chrissie White as Lavender  
 Alma Taylor as Ruth Rolfe  
 Stewart Rome as Geoffrey Wedderburn  
 J.V. Bryant as Clement Hale  
 Violet Hopson

References

Bibliography
 Palmer, Scott. British Film Actors' Credits, 1895-1987. McFarland, 1988.

External links

1915 films
1910s romance films
British films based on plays
British romance films
British silent feature films
1910s English-language films
Films directed by Cecil Hepworth
Films set in England
Hepworth Pictures films
British black-and-white films
1910s British films